= Constituency NM-366 =

Former constituency of the Punjabi Provincial Legislature, Pakistan

W-366
- Minority Reserved constituency for the Provincial Assembly of Punjab

Current constituency

NM-366 is a Minority reserved Constituency in the Provincial Assembly of Punjab.

== See also ==
- Punjab, Pakistan
